Home from Home was a British TV series shown on Channel 4 from 2001 to 2004. The show was a travel documentary based on two families home swapping for vacation.The show's narrator was Emma Kennedy.

References

External links
Home from Home at IMDb

Channel 4 original programming